Massing is an architectural term.

Massing may also refer to:

Massing (surname)
Massing, Germany, municipality in Rottal-Inn, Bavaria, Germany